Michael J. Maroney is a Republican member of the West Virginia Senate, representing the 2nd district since January 11, 2017.

Maroney serves as the Senate Chair for the Health and Human Resources Committee and serves as Vice Chair of the Military Committee. He also serves as a member on additional Senate committees including Finance, Government Organization, Rules, and Workforce.

On August 28, 2019, Maroney was arrested for soliciting a prostitute. He pleaded not guilty. His case has been continued four times, most recently in October 2020 after the circuit court considered a request for a special prosecutor due to an alleged conflict of interest by Marshall County Prosecuting Attorney Rhonda Wade. The charges were dismissed in March 2021.

Election results

2020: After some public ambivalence due to pending criminal litigation, Maroney ran in the June 2020 Republican primary, where he faced challenger Elijah Dean. Maroney beat Dean 61-39%. Maroney then faced Josh Gary, a John Marshall High School teacher, in the November general election. Gary criticized Maroney for his pending legal troubles throughout the race, calling for more details to be released about the criminal charges and civil litigation Maroney is facing. Maroney beat Gary by a 56-44% margin to win a second term.

2016: After State Senate Minority Leader Jeff Kessler announced his candidacy for Governor in the 2016 Governor Election, he left a vacancy in Senate District 2, where he served for 20 years. Maroney, a radiologist, faced Ginger Nalley, a small business owner, in the Republican primary. Maroney beat Nalley 54-46% to advance to the November general election. Maroney faced Democratic nominee Lisa Zukoff, a small business owner, and Libertarian H. John Rogers in the general election. Maroney won the race with 54% of the vote.

References

1968 births
Living people
People from Glen Dale, West Virginia
Politicians from Wheeling, West Virginia
Republican Party West Virginia state senators
Physicians from West Virginia
West Virginia University alumni
Marshall University alumni
21st-century American politicians